Stevan Doronjski (26 September 1919 – 14 August 1981) was a Yugoslav civil servant from Serbia who served as President of the Presidency of the League of Communists of Yugoslavia, the ruling party of the nation. 

Doronjski was born in 1919 in the village of Krčedin in the Srem region of Serbia to a peasant family. He studied veterinary medicine at the University of Belgrade and joined the Communist Party in 1939. He fought with the Partisans in World War II and after the war held a number of political posts in the newly-formed Socialist Federal Republic of Yugoslavia.

Doronjski died on 14 August 1981 at the age of 61.

References 

 Encyclopedia of Yugoslavia (Book Three). "Југославенски лексикографски завод“, Zagreb 1984.

1919 births
1981 deaths
League of Communists of Serbia politicians
Central Committee of the League of Communists of Yugoslavia members